RBP The oil and gas industry uses many acronyms and abbreviations.

This list is meant for indicative purposes only and should not be relied upon for anything but general information.

#
1C – Proved contingent resources 
1oo2 – One out of two voting (instrumentation)
1P – Proven reserves
2C – Proved and probable contingent resources
2D – two-dimensional (geophysics)
2oo2 – Two out of two voting (instrumentation)
2oo3 – Two out of three voting (instrumentation)
2P – proved and probable reserves
3C – three components seismic acquisition (x, y, and z)
3C – Proved, probable and possible contingent resources
3D – three-dimensional (geophysics)
3P – proved, probable and possible reserves
4D – multiple 3Ds acquired over time (the 4th D) over the same area with the same parameters (geophysics)
8rd – eight round (describes the number of revolutions per inch of pipe thread)

A
A – Appraisal (well)
AADE – American Association of Drilling Engineers
AAPG – American Association of Petroleum Geologists
AAPL – American Association of Professional Landmen
AAODC – American Association of Oilwell Drilling Contractors (obsolete; superseded by IADC)
AAV – Annulus access valve
ABAN – Abandonment, (also as AB and ABD and ABND)
ABSA – Alberta Boilers Safety Association
ABT – Annulus bore test
ACC – Air-cooled heat condenser
ACHE – Air-cooled heat exchanger
ACOU – Acoustic
ACP – Alkali-cosolvent-polymer
ACQU – Acquisition log
ACV – Automatic control valve
ADE – Advanced decision-making environment
ADEP – Awaiting development with exploration potential, referring to an asset
ADROC – advanced rock properties report
ADT – Applied drilling technology, ADT log
ADM – Advanced diagnostics module (fieldbus)
AER – Auto excitation regulator
AEMO – Australian Energy Market Operator
AFE – Authorization for expenditure, a process of submitting a business proposal to investors
AFP – Active rire protection
AGA – American Gas Association
AGRU – acid gas removal unit
AGT – (1) agitator, used in drilling
AGT – (2) authorised gas tester (certified by OPITTO)
AGT – (3) Azerbaijan – Georgia – Turkey (a region rich in oil related activity)
AHBDF – along hole (depth) below Derrick floor
AHD – along hole depth
AHU – air handling unit
AICD – autonomous inflow control device
AIChemE – American Institute of Chemical Engineers
AIM – asset integrity management
AIPSM – asset integrity and process safety management
AIR – assurance interface and risk
AIRG – airgun
AIRRE – airgun report
 AISC – American Institute of Steel Construction
 AISI – American Iron and Steel Institute
AIT – analyzer indicator transmitter
AIT – array induction tool
AL – appraisal license (United Kingdom), a type of onshore licence issued before 1996
ALAP – as low as possible (used along with density of mud)
ALARP – as low as reasonably practicable
ALC – vertical seismic profile acoustic log calibration report
ALLMS – anchor leg load monitoring system
ALQ – additional living quarters
ALR – acoustic log report
ALT – altered
AM – asset management
aMDEA – activated methyldiethanolamine
AMS – auxiliary measurement service log; auxiliary measurement sonde (temperature)
AMSL – above mean sea level
AMI – area of mutual interest
AMV – annulus master valve
ANACO – analysis of core logs report
ANARE – analysis report
AOF – absolute open flow
AOFP – absolute open-flow potential
AOI – area of interest
AOL – arrive on location
AOR – additional oil recovery
AP – alkali-polymer
APD – application for permit to drill
API – American Petroleum Institute: organization which sets unit standards in the oil and gas industry
APPRE – appraisal report
APS – active pipe support
APWD – annular pressure while drilling (tool) 
ARACL – array acoustic log
ARESV – analysis of reservoir
ARI – azimuthal resistivity image
ARRC – array acoustic report
ART – actuator running tool
AS – array sonic processing log
ASD - acoustic sand detection
ASI – ASI log
ASME – American Society of Mechanical Engineers
ASOG – activity-specific operating guidelines
ASP – array sonic processing report
ASP – alkali-surfactant-polymer
ASTM – American Society for Testing and Materials
ASCSSV – annulus surface controlled sub-surface valve
ASV – anti-surge valve
ASV – annular safety valve
ASV – accommodation and support vessel
ATD – application to drill
ATU – auto top-up unit
AUV – authonomus underwater vehicle
AV – annular velocity or apparent viscosity
AVGMS – annulus vent gas monitoring system
AVO – amplitude versus offset (geophysics)
AWB/V – annulus wing block/valve (XT)
AWO – approval for well operation
ATM – at the moment

B
B or b – prefix denoting a number in billions
BA – bottom assembly (of a riser)
bbl – barrel
BBG – buy back gas
BBSM – behaviour-based safety management 
BCPD – barrels condensate per day
Bcf – billion cubic feet (of natural gas)
Bcfe – billion cubic feet (of natural gas equivalent)
BD – bursting disc
BDF – below derrick floor
BDL – bit data log
BDV – blowdown valve
BGL – borehole geometry log
BGL – below ground level (used as a datum for depths in a well)
BGS – British Geological Survey
BGT – borehole geometry tool
BGWP – base of ground-water protection
BH – bloodhound
BHA – bottom hole assembly (toolstring on coiled tubing or drill pipe)
BHC – BHC gamma ray log
BHCA – BHC acoustic log
BHCS – BHC sonic log
BHCT – bottomhole circulating temperature
BHKA – bottomhole kickoff assembly
BHL – borehole log
BHP – bottom hole pressure
BHPRP – borehole pressure report
BHSRE – bottom hole sampling report
BHSS – borehole seismic survey
BHT – bottomhole temperature
BHTV – borehole television report
BINXQ – bond index quicklook log
BIOR – biostratigraphic range log
BIORE – biostratigraphy study report
BSLM – bend stiffener latch mechanism
BSW – base sediment and water
BIVDL – BI/DK/WF/casing collar locator/gamma ray log
BLD – bailed (refers to the practice of removing debris from the hole with a cylindrical container on a wireline)
BLI – bottom of logging interval
BLP – bridge-linked platform
BO – back-off log
BO – barrel of oil
boe – barrels of oil equivalent
boed – barrels of oil equivalent per day
BOEM – Bureau of Ocean Energy Management
boepd – barrels of oil equivalent per day
BOB – back on bottom
BOD – biological oxygen demand
BOL – bill of lading
BOM – bill of materials
BOP – blowout preventer
BOP – bottom of pipe
BOPD – barrels of oil per day
BOPE – blowout prevention equipment
BOREH – borehole seismic analysis
BOSIET – basic offshore safety induction and emergency training
BOTHL – bottom hole locator log
BOTTO – bottom hole pressure/temperature report
BP – bridge plug
BPD – barrels per day
BPH – barrels per hour
BPFL – borehole profile log
BPLUG – baker plug
BPM – barrels per minute
BPV – back pressure valve (goes on the end of coiled tubing a drill pipe tool strings to prevent fluid flow in the wrong direction)
BQL – B/QL log
BRPLG – bridge plug log
BRT – below rotary table (used as a datum for depths in a well)
BS – bend stiffener
BS – bumper sub
BS – booster station
BSEE –  US: Bureau of Safety and Environmental Enforcement (formerly the MMS)
BSG – black start generator 
BSR – blind shear rams (blowout preventer)
BSML – below sea mean level
BS&W – basic sediments and water
BT – buoyancy tank
BTEX – benzene, toluene, ethyl-benzene and xylene
BTHL – bottom hole log
BTO/C – break to open/close (valve torque)
BTU – British thermal units
BU – bottom up
BUL – bottom-up lag
BUR – build-up rate
BVO – ball valve operator
bwd – barrels of water per day (often used in reference to oil production)
bwipd – barrels of water injected per day
 – barrels of water per day

C
C&E – well completion and equipment cost
C&S – cased and suspended
C1 – methane
C2 – ethane
C3 – propane
C4 – butane
C6 – hexanes
C7+ – heavy hydrocarbon components
CA – core analysis log
CAAF – contract authorization approval form
CalGEM – California Geologic Energy Management Division (oil & gas regulatory body)
CALI – caliper log
CALOG – circumferential acoustic log
CALVE – calibrated velocity log data
CAODC – Canadian Association of Oilwell Drilling Contractors
CAPP – Canadian Association of Petroleum Producers
CART – cam-actuated running tool (housing running tool)
CART – cap replacement tool
CAS – casing log
CAT – connector actuating tool
CB – casing bowl
CB – core barrel
CBF – casing bowl flange
CBIL – CBIL log
CBL – cement bond log (measurement of casing cement integrity)
CBM – choke bridge module – XT choke
CBM – conventional buoy mooring
CBM – coal-bed methane
CCHT – core chart log
CCL – casing collar locator (in perforation or completion operations, the tool provides depths by correlation of the casing string's magnetic anomaly with known casing features)
CCLBD – construction / commissioning logic block diagram
CCLP – casing collar locator perforation
CCLTP – casing collar locator through tubing plug
CD – core description
CDATA – core data
CDIS – CDI synthetic seismic log
CDU – control distribution unit
CDU – crude distillation unit
CDP – common depth point (geophysics)
CDP – comprehensive drilling plan
CDRCL – compensated dual resistivity cal. log
CDF – core contaminated by drilling fluid
CDFT – critical device function test
CE – CE log
CEC – cation-exchange capacity
CECAN – CEC analysis
CEME – cement evaluation
CEOR – chemical-enhanced oil recovery
CER – central electrical/equipment room
CERE – cement remedial log
CET – cement evaluation tool
CF  – completion fluid
CF  – casing flange
CFD – computational fluid dynamics
CFGPD – cubic feet of gas per day
CFU – compact flotation unit
CGEL – CG EL log
CGL – core gamma log
CGPA – Canadian Gas Processors Association
CGPH – core graph log
CGR – condensate gas ratio
CGTL – compact gas to liquids (production equipment small enough to fit on a ship)
CHCNC – CHCNC gamma ray casing collar locator
CHDTP – calliper HDT playback log
CHECK – checkshot and acoustic calibration report
CHESM – contractor, health, environment and safety management
CHF – casing head flange
CHK – choke (a restriction in a flowline or a system, usually referring to a production choke during a test or the choke in the well control system)
CHKSR – checkshot survey report
CHKSS – checkshot survey log
CHOPS – cold heavy oil production with sand
CHP – casing hanger pressure (pressure in an annulus as measured at the casing hanger)
CHOTO – commissioning, handover and takeover
CHROM – chromatolog
CHRT – casing hanger running tool
CIBP – cast iron bridge plug
CIDL – chemical injection downhole lower
CIDU – chemical injection downhole upper
CIL – chemical injection line
CILD – conduction log
CIMV – chemical injection metering valve
CIRC – circulation
CITHP – closed-in tubing head pressure (tubing head pressure when the well is shut in)
CIV – chemical injection valve
CK – choke (a restriction in a flowline or a system, usually referring to a production choke during a test or the choke in the well control system)
CL – core log
CLG – core log and graph
CM – choke module
CMC – crown mounted compensators 
CMC – critical micelle concentration 
CMP – common midpoint (geophysics)
CMR – combinable magnetic resonance (NMR log tool) 
CMT – cement
CNA – clay, no analysis
CND – compensated neutron density
CNFDP – CNFD true vertical-depth playback log
CNGR – compensated neutron gamma-ray log
CNL – compensated neutron log
CNLFD – CNL/FDC log
CNS – Central North Sea
CNCF – field-normalised compensated neutron porosity
CNR – Canadian natural resources
CO – change out (ex. from rod equipment to casing equipment)
COA – conditions of approval
COC – certificate of conformance
COD – chemical oxygen demand
COL – collar log
COMAN – compositional analysis
COML – compaction log
COMP – composite log
COMPR – completion program report
COMPU – computest report
COMRE – completion record log
COND – condensate production
CONDE – condensate analysis report
CONDR – continuous directional log
CORAN – core analysis report
CORE – core report
CORG – corgun log
CORIB – CORIBAND log
CORLG – correlation log
COROR – core orientation report
COW – Control of Work
COXY – carbon/oxygen log
CP – cathodic protection
CP – crown plug
cP – centipoise (viscosity unit of measurement)
CPI separator – corrugated plate interceptor
CPI – computer-processed interpretation 
CPI – corrugated plate interceptor
CPICB – computer-processed interpretation coriband log
CPIRE – computer-processed interpretation report
CPP - central processing platform
CRA – corrosion-resistant alloy
CRET – cement retainer setting log
CRI – cuttings reinjection
CRINE – cost reduction in the new era
CRP – control riser platform
CRP – common/central reference point (subsea survey)
CRT – clamp replacement tool
CRT – casing running tool
CSE – confined space entry
CsF – caesium formate
CSC – car seal closed
CSG – coal seam gas
csg – casing
CSHN – cased-hole neutron log
CSI – combinable seismic imager (VSP) log (Schlumberger)
CSMT – core sampler tester log
CSO – complete seal-off
CSO – car seal open
CSPG – Canadian Society of Petroleum Geologists
CSR – corporate social responsibility
CST – chronological sample taker log (Schlumberger)
CSTAK – core sample taken log
CSTR – continuously-stirred tank reactor
CSTRE – CST report
CSU – commissioning and start-up
CSU – construction safety unit
CSUG – Canadian Society for Unconventional Gas
CT – coiled tubing
CTD – coiled tubing drilling
CTCO – coiled tubing clean-out
CTLF – coiled tubing lift frame
CTLF – compensated tension lift frame
CTOD – crack tip opening displacement
CTP – commissioning test procedure 
CTRAC – cement tracer log
CUI – corrosion under insulation
CUL - cross-unit lateral
CUT – cutter log
CUTTD – cuttings description report
CWOP – complete well on paper
CWOR – completion work over riser
CWR – cooling water return
CWS – cooling water supply
X/O – cross-over
CYBD – Cyberbond log
CYBLK – Cyberlook log
CYDIP – Cyberdip log
CYDN – Cyberdon log
CYPRO – Cyberproducts log
CVX - Chevron

D
D – development
D – Darcy, unit of permeability
D&C – drilling and completions
D&I – direction and inclination (MWD borehole deviation survey) 
DAC – dipole acoustic log
DARCI – Darci log
DAS – data acquisition system
DAT – wellhead housing drill-ahead tool
DAZD – dip and azimuth display
DBB – double block and bleed
DBP – drillable bridge plug
DBR – damaged beyond repair
DC – drill centre
DC – drill collar/collars
DCAL – dual caliper log
DCC – distance cross course
DCS – distributed control system
DD – directional driller or directional drilling
DDC – daily drilling cost
DDC – de-watering and drying contract
DDBHC – DDBHC waveform log
DDET – depth determination log
DDM – derrick drilling machine (a.k.a. top drive)
DDNL – dual det. neutron life log
DDPT – drill data plot log
DDPU – double drum pulling unit
DDR - daily drilling report
DEA – diethanolamine
DECC – Department for Energy and Climate Change (UK)
DECT – decay time
DECT – down-hole electric cutting tool
DEFSU – definitive survey report
DEH – direct electrical heating
DELTA – delta-T log
DEN – density log
DEPAN – deposit analysis report
DEPC – depth control log
DEPT – depth
DESFL – deep induction SFL log
DEV – development well, Lahee classification
DEVLG – deviation log
DEXP – D-exponent log
DF – derrick floor
DFI – design, fabrication and installation résumé
DFIT – diagnostic fracture injection test
DFPH – Barrels of fluid per hour
DFR – drilling factual report
DG/DG# – diesel generator ('#'- means identification letter or number of the equipment i.e. DG3 or DG#3 means diesel generator nr 3)
DGA – diglycoamine
DGDS – dual-gradient drilling systems
DGP – dynamic geohistory plot (3D technique)
DH – drilling history
DHC – depositional history curve
DHSV – downhole safety valve
DHPG – downhole pressure gauge
DHPTT – downhole pressure/temperature transducer
DIBHC – DIS BHC log
DIEGR – dielectric gamma ray log
DIF – drill in fluids
DIL – dual-induction log
DILB – dual-induction BHC log
DILL – dual-induction laterolog
DILLS – dual-induction log-LSS
DILSL – dual-induction log-SLS
DIM – directional inertia mechanism
DINT – dip interpretation
DIP – dipmeter log
DIPAR – dipole acoustic report
DIPBH – dipmeter borehole log
DIPFT – dipmeter fast log
DIPLP – dip lithology pressure log
DIPRE – dipmeter report
DIPRM – dip removal log
DIPSA – dipmeter soda log
DIPSK – dipmeter stick log
DIRS – directional survey log
DIRSU – directional survey report
DIS – DIS-SLS log
DISFL – DISFL DBHC gamma ray log
DISO – dual induction sonic log
DL – development license (United Kingdom), a type of onshore license issued before 1996
DLIST – dip-list log
DLL – dual laterolog (deep and shallow resistivity)
DLS – dog-leg severity (directional drilling)
DM – dry mate
DMA – dead-man anchor
DMAS – dead-man auto-shear DMAS
DMRP – density – magnetic resonance porosity (wireline tool)
DMT – down-hole monitoring tool
DNHO – down-hole logging
DOA – delegation of authority
DOE – Department of Energy, United States
DOGGR – Division of Oil, Gas, and Geothermal Resources (former name of California's regulatory entity for oil, gas, and geothermal production) 
DOPH – drilled-out plugged hole
DOWRE – downhole report
DP – drill pipe
DP – dynamic positioning
DPDV – dynamically positioned drilling vessel
DPL – dual propagation log
DPLD – differential pressure levitated device (or vehicle)
DPRES – dual propagation resistivity log
DPT – deeper pool test, Lahee classification
DQLC – dipmeter quality control log
DR – dummy-run log
DR – drilling report
DRI – drift log
DRL – drilling
DRLCT – drilling chart
DRLOG – drilling log
DRLPR – drilling proposal/progress report
DRO – discovered resources opportunities
DRPG – drilling program report
DRPRS – drilling pressure
DRREP – drilling report
DRYRE – drying report
DS – deviation survey, (also directional system)
DSCAN – DSC analysis report
DSI – dipole shear imager
DSL – digital spectralog (western atlas)
DSPT – cross-plots log
DST – drill-stem test
DSTG – DSTG log
DSTL – drill-stem test log
DSTND – dual-space thermal neutron density log
DSTPB – drill-stem test true vertical depth playback log
DSTR – drill-stem test report
DSTRE – drill-stem test report
DSTSM – drill-stem test summary report
DSTW – drill-stem test job report/works
DSU – drill spacing unit
DSV – diving support vessel or drilling supervisor
DTI – Department of Trade and Industry (UK) (obsolete; superseded by dBERR, which was then superseded by DECC)
DTPB – CNT true vertical-depth playback log
DTT – depth to time
DUC – drilled but uncompleted wells
DVT – differential valve tool (for cementing multiple stages)
DWOP – drilling well on paper (a theoretical exercise conducted involving the service-provider managers)
DWQL – dual-water quicklook log
DWSS – dig-well seismic surface log
DXC – DXC pressure pilot report

E
E – exploration
E&A – exploration and appraisal
E&I – electrical and instrumentation
E&P – exploration and production, another name for the upstream sector
EA – exploration asset
EAGE – European Association of Geoscientists and Engineers
ECA – Easington Catchment Area
ECD – equivalent circulating density
EDG/EDGE – emergency diesel generator
ECMS – electrical control and monitoring system
ECMWF – European Centre for Medium-Range Weather Forecasts
ECP – external casing packer
ECRD – electrically-controlled release device (for abandoning stuck wireline tool from cable)
ECT – external cantilevered turret
EDP – exploration drilling program report
EDP – emergency disconnect pPackage
EDP – emergency depressurisation
EDPHOT – emergency drill pipe hang-off tool
EDR – exploration drilling report
EDR – electronic drilling recorder
EDS – emergency disconnection sequence
EEAR – emergency electrical auto restart
EEHA – electrical equipment for hazardous areas (IECEx)
EFL – electrical flying lead
EFR – engineering factual report
EHT – electric heat trace
EGBE – ethylene glycol monobutyl ether (2-butoxyethanol)
EGMBE – ethylene glycol monobutyl ether
EHU – electro-hydraulic unit
EIA – environmental impact assessment
EI – Energy Institute
ELEC TECH – electronics technician
ELT – economic limit test
EL – electric log
EM – EMOP log
EMCS – energy management and control systems
EMD – equivalent mud density
EMG – equivalent mud gradient
EMOP – EMOP well site processing log
EMP – electromagnetic propagation log
EMR – electronic memory read-out
EMS – environment measurement sonde (wireline multi-caliper) 
EMW – equivalent mud weight
EN PI – enhanced productivity index log
ENG – engineering log
ENGF – engineer factual report
ENGPD – engineering porosity data
Eni – Ente Nazionale Idrocarburi S.p.A. (Italy)
ENJ – enerjet log
ENMCS – electrical network monitoring and control system
EOFL – end of field life
EOR – enhanced oil recovery
EOT – end of tubing
EOT – electric overhead travelling
ELV – extra-low voltage
EOW – end-of-well report
EPCM/I – engineering procurement construction and management/installation
EPCU – electrical power conditioning unit
EPIDORIS – exploration and production integrated drilling operations and reservoir information system
EPL – EPL log
EPLG – epilog
EPLPC – EPL-PCD-SGR log
EPS – early production system
EPT – electromagnetic propagation
EPU – electrical power unit
EPTNG – EPT-NGT log
EPV – early production vessel
 – extended reach (drilling)
ERT – emergency response training
ESD – emergency shutdown
ESDV – emergency shutdown valve
ESHIA – environmental, social and health impact assessment
ESIA – environmental and social impact assessment
ESP – electric submersible pump
ETAP – Eastern Trough Area Project
ETD – external turret disconnectable
ETECH – electronics technician
ETTD – electromagnetic thickness test
ETU – electrical test unit
EUE – external-upset-end (tubing connection)
EUR – estimated ultimate recovery
EVARE – evaluation report
EWMP – earthworks/electrical works/excavation works management plan
EWR – end-of-well report
EXL – or XL, exploration licence (United Kingdom), a type of onshore licence issued between the first onshore licensing round (1986) and the sixth (1992)
EXP – exposed
EZSV – easy sliding valve (drillable packer plug)

F
F&G – fire and gas
FAC – factual report
FAC – first aid case
FACHV – four-arm calliper log
FANAL – formation analysis sheet log
FANG – friction angle
FAR – Field Auxiliary Room 
FAT – factory acceptance testing
FB – full bore
FBE – fusion-bonded epoxy
FBHP – flowing bottom-hole pressure
FC – float collar
FC – fail closed (valve or damper)
FCGT – flood clean gauge test
FCM – flow control module
FCP – final circulating pressure
FCV – flow control valve
FCVE – F-curve log
FDC – formation density log
FDF – forced-draft fan
FDP – field development plan
FDS – functional design specification
FDT – fractional dead time
FEED – front-end engineering design
FEL – from east line
FER – field equipment room
FER - formation evaluation report
FEWD – formation evaluation while drilling
FFAC – formation factor log
FFM – full field model
FG – fiberglass
FGHT – flood gauge hydrotest
FRP – fiberglass reinforced plastics
FGEOL – final geological report
FH – full-hole tool joint
FI – final inspection
FID – final investment decision
FID – flame ionisation detection
FIH – finish in hole (tripping pipe)
FIL – FIL log
 – free issue (materials)
FINST – final stratigraphic report
FINTP – formation interpretation
FIP – flow-induced pulsation
FIT – fairing intervention tool
FIT – fluid identification test
FIT – formation integrity test
FIT – formation interval tester
FIT – flow indicator transmitter
FIV – flow-induced vibration
FIV – formation isolation valve
FJC – field joint coating
FL – F log
FL – fail locked (valve or damper)
FL – fluid level
FLAP –fluid level above pump
FLB – field logistics base
FLDF – flying lead deployment frame
FLIV – flowline injection valve
FLIV – flowline isolation valve
FLET – flowline end termination
aFLET – actuated flowline end termination
FLNG – floating liquefied natural gas
FLOG – FLOG PHIX RHGX log
FLOPR – flow profile report
FLOT – flying lead orientation tool
FLOW – flow and buildup test report
FLRA – field-level risk assessment
FLS – fluid sample
FLT – fault (geology)
FLT – flying lead termination
FLTC – fail locked tending to close
FLTO – fail locked tending to open
FMD – flooded member detection
FMEA – failure modes, & effects analysis
FMECA – failure modes, effects, and criticality analysis
FMI – formation micro imaging log (azimuthal microresistivity)
FMP – formation microscan report
FMP – Field Management Plan
FMS – formation multi-scan log; formation micro-scan log
FMS – flush-mounted slips
FMT – flow management tool
FMTAN – FMT analysis report
FNL – from north line
FO – fail open (valve or damper)
FOBOT – fibre optic breakout tray
FOET – further offshore emergency training
FOF – face of flange
FOH – finish out of hole (tripping pipe)
FOSA – field operating services agreement
FOSV – full-opening safety valve
FPDM – fracture potential and domain modelling/mapping
FPH – feet per hour
FPIT – free-point indicator tool
FPL – flow analysis log
FPLP – freshman petroleum learning program (Penn State)
FPLAN – field plan log
FPS – field production system
FPO – floating production and offloading – vessel with no or very limited (process only) on-board produced fluid storage capacity.
FPSO – floating production storage and offloading vessel
FPU – floating processing unit
FRA – fracture log
FRARE – fracture report
FRES – final reserve report
FS – fail safe
FSB – flowline support base
FSI – flawless start-up initiative
FSL – from south line
FSLT – flexible sealine lifting tool
FSO – floating storage offloading vessel
FSR – facility status report
FSU – floating storage unit
FT – formation tester log
FTL – field team leader
FTM – fire-team member
FTP – first tranche petroleum
FTP – field terminal platform
FTR – function test report
FTRE – formation testing report
FULDI – full diameter study report
FV – funnel viscosity
FV –  float valve
FWHP – flowing well-head pressure
FWKO – free water knock-out
FWL – free water level
FWL – from West line
FWR – final well report
FWV – flow wing valve (also known as production wing valve on a christmas tree)
FR - flow rate

G
G/C – gas condensate
GC – gathering center
G&P – gathering and processing
G&T – gathering and transportation
GALT – gross air leak test
GAS – gas log
GASAN – gas analysis report
GBS – gravity-based structure
GBT – gravity base tank
GCB – generator circuit breaker
GCLOG – graphic core log
GCT – GCT log
GDAT – geodetic datum
GDE – gross depositional environment
GDIP – geodip log
GDT – gas down to
GE  – condensate gas equivalent
GE  – ground elevation (also GR, or GRE)
GEOCH – geochemical evaluation
GEODY – GEO DYS log
GEOEV – geochemical evaluation report
GEOFO – geological and formation evaluation report
GEOL – geological surveillance log
GEOP – geophone data log
GEOPN – geological well prognosis report
GEOPR – geological operations progress report
GEORE – geological report
GGRG – gauge ring
GIIP – gas initially in place
GIH – go in hole
GIS – geographic information system
GL – gas lift
GL – ground level
GLE – ground level elevation (generally in metres above mean sea level)
GLM – gas lift mandrel (alternative name for side pocket mandrel)
GLR – gas-liquid ratio
GLT – GLT log
GLV – gas lift valve
GLW –
GM – gas migration
GOC – gas oil contact
GOM – Gulf of Mexico
GOP – geological operations report
GOR – gas oil ratio
GOSP – gas/oil separation plant
GPIT – general-purpose inclinometry tool (borehole survey) 
GPLT – geol plot log
GPTG – gallons per thousand gallons
GPM – gallons per Mcf
GPSL – geo pressure log
GR  – ground level
GR – gamma ray
GR – gauge ring (measure hole size)
GRAD – gradiometer log
GRE – ground elevation
GRLOG – grapholog
GRN – gamma ray neutron log
GRP – glass-reinforced plastic
GRV – gross rock volume
GRSVY – gradient survey log
GS – gas supplier
GS  – gel strength
GST – GST log
GTC/G –gas turbine compressor/generator
GTL – gas to liquids
GTW – gas to wire
GUN – gun set log
GWC – gas-water contact
GWR – guided wave radar
GWREP – geo well report

H
HAT – highest astronomical tide
HAZ – heat-affected zone
HAZID – hazard identification (meeting)
HAZOP – hazard and operability study (meeting)
HBE – high-build epoxy
HBP – held by production
HC – hydrocarbons
HCAL – HRCC caliper (in logs)(in inches)
HCCS – horizontal clamp connection system
HCM – horizontal connection module (to connect the christmas tree to the manifold)
HCS – high-capacity square mesh screens
HD – head
HDA – helideck assistant
HDD – horizontal directional drilling
HDPE – high-density polyethylene
HDT – high-resolution dipmeter log
HDU – horizontal drive unit
HEXT – hex diplog
HFE – human factors engineering
HFL – hydraulic flying lead
HGO – heavy gas oil
HGS – high (wpecific-)gravity solids
HH – horse head (on pumping unit)
HHP – hydraulic horsepower
HI – hydrogen index
HiPAP – high-precision acoustic positioning
HIPPS – high-integrity pressure protection system
HIRA – hazard identification and risk assessment
HISC – hydrogen-induced stress cracking
HKLD – hook load
HL – hook load
HLCV – heavy-lift crane vessel
HLO – heavy load-out (facility)
HLO – helicopter landing officer
Hmax – maximum wave height
HNGS – flasked hostile natural gamma-ray spectrometry tool 
HO – hole opener
HOB – hang on bridle (cable assembly)
HMR – heating medium return
HMS – heating medium supply
HP – hydrostatic pressure
HPAM – partially hydrolyzed polyacrylamide 
HPGAG – high-pressure gauge
HPHT – high-pressure high-temperature
HPPS – HP pressure log
HPU – hydraulic power unit
HPWBM – high-performance water-based mud
HRCC – HCAl of caliper (in inches)
HRLA – high-resolution laterolog array (resistivity logging tool)
HRF – hyperbaric rescue facility/vessel
HRSG – heat recovery steam generator
Hs – significant wave height
HSE – health, safety and environment or Health & Safety Executive (United Kingdom)
HSV – hyperbaric support vessel
HTHP – high-temperature high pressure
HTM – helideck team member
HVDC – high voltage direct current
HWDP – heavy-weight drill pipe (sometimes spelled hevi-wate)
HUD – hold-up depth
HUN – hold-up nipple
HUET – helicopter underwater escape training
HVAC – heating, ventilation and air-conditioning
HWDP – heavy weight drill pipe
HYPJ – hyperjet
HYROP – hydrophone log

I
I:P – injector to producer ratio
IADC – International Association of Drilling Contractors
IAT – internal active turret
IBC – intermediate bulk container
IC – instrument cable
ICoTA – Intervention and Coiled Tubing Association
ICC – isolation confirmation (or control) certificate
ICD – inflow control device
ICEX;IECEx – international electrotechnical commission system for certification to standards relating to equipment for use in explosive atmospheres (EEHA)
ICP – initial circulating pressure
ICP – intermediate casing point
ICP – inductively coupled plasma
ICSS – integrated controls and safety system
ICSU – integrated commissioning and start-up
ICV – interval control valve
ICV – integrated cement volume (of borehole)
ICW – incomplete work
ID – inner or internal diameter (of a tubular component such as a casing)
IDC – intangible drilling costs
IDEL – IDEL log
IEB – induction electro BHC log
IEL – induction electrical log
IF – internal flush tool joint
iFLS – intelligent fast load shedding
IFP – French Institute of Petroleum (Institut Français du Petrole)
IFT – interfacial tension
IGPE – immersion grade phenolic epoxy
IGV – inlet guide vane
IH – gamma ray log
IHEC – isolation of hazardous energy certificate
IHUC – installation, hook-up and commissioning
IHV – integrated hole volume (of borehole) 
IIC – infield installation contractor
IJL – injection log
IL – induction log
ILI – inline inspection (intelligent pigging)
ILOGS – image logs
ILT – inline tee
IMAG – image analysis report
IMCA – International Marine Contractors Association
IMPP – injection-molded polypropylene coating system
IMR – inspection, maintenance, and repair
INCR – incline report
INCRE – incline report
INDRS – IND RES sonic log
INDT – INDT log
INDWE – individual well record report
INJEC – injection falloff log
INS – insufficient sample
INS – integrated navigation system
INSUR – inrun survey report
INVES – investigative program report
IOC – international oil company
IOM – installation, operation and maintenance manual
IOS – internal olefin sulfonate
IOS – isomerized olefin sulfonate
IP – ingress protection
IP – Institute of Petroleum, now Energy Institute
IP – intermediate pressure
IPAA – Independent Petroleum Association of America
IPC – installed production capacity
IPLS – IPLS log
IPR – inflow performance relationship
IPT – internal passive turret
IR – interpretation report
IRC – inspection release certificate
IRDV – inelegant remote dual valve
IRTJ – IRTJ gamma ray slimhole log
ISD – instrument-securing device
ISF – ISF sonic log
ISFBG – ISF BHC GR log
ISFCD – ISF conductivity log
ISFGR – ISF GR casing collar locator log
ISFL – ISF-LSS log
ISFP – ISF sonic true vertical depth playback log
ISFPB – ISF true vertical depth playback log
ISFSL – ISF SLS MSFL log
ISIP – initial shut-in pressure
ISSOW – integrated safe system of work
ISV – infield support vessel
ITD – internal turret disconnectable
ITO – inquiry to order
ITR – inspection test record
ITS – influx to surface
ITT – internal testing tool (for BOP test)
IUG – instrument utility gas
IWCF – International Well Control Federation
IWOCS – installation/workover control system
IWTT – interwell tracer test

J
J&A – junked and abandoned
JB – junk basket
JHA – job hazard analysis
JIB – joint-interest nilling
JLT – J-lay tower
JSA – job safety analysis
JT – Joule-Thomson (effect/valve/separator)
JTS – joints
JU – jack-up drilling rig
JV – joint venture
JVP – joint venture partners/participants

K
KB  – kelly bushing
KBE – kelly bushing elevation (in meters above sea level, or meters above ground level)
KBG – kelly bushing height above ground level
KBUG – kelly bushing underground (drilling up in coal mines, West Virginia, Baker & Taylor drilling)
KCI – potassium chloride
KD  – kelly down
KMW – kill mud weight
KOEBD – gas converted to oil-equivalent at 6 million cubic feet = 1 thousand barrels
KOH – potassium hydroxide 
KOP – kick-off point (directional drilling)
KOP – kick-off plug
KP – kilometre post
KRP – kill rate pressure
KT – kill truck
KLPD- kiloliters per day

L
LACT – lease automatic custody transfer
LAH – lookahead
LAOT – linear activation override tool
LARS – launch and recovery system
LAS – Log ASCII standard
LAT – lowest astronomical tide
LBL – long baseline (acoustics)
LC – locked closed
LCM – lost circulation material
LCNLG – LDT CNL gamma ray log
LCR – local control room
LCV – level control valve
L/D – lay down (such as tubing or rods)
LD – lay down (such as tubing or rods)
LDAR – leak detection and repair
LDHI – low-dosage hydrate inhibitor
LDL – litho density log
LDS – leak detection system (pipeline monitoring)
LDTEP – LDT EPT gamma ray log
LEAKL – leak detection log
LEPRE – litho-elastic property report
LER – lands eligible for remining or land equivalent ratio
LER – Local Equipment Room
LGO – Light Gas Oil
LGR – Liquid Gas Ratio
LGS – Low (specific-)Gravity Solids
LIC – License
LIB – Lead Impression Block
LINCO – Liner and Completion Progress Report
LIOG – Lithography Log
LIT – Lead Impression Tool
LIT – level indicator transmitter
LITDE – Litho Density Quicklook Log
LITHR – Lithological Description Report
LITRE – Lithostratigraphy Report
LITST – Lithostratigraphic Log
LKO – Lowest Known Oil
LL – Laterolog
LMAP – Location Map
LMRP – Lower Marine Riser Package
LMTD – Log Mean Temperature Difference
LMV – Lower Master Valve (on a Xmas tree)
LNG – Liquefied Natural Gas
LO – Locked Open
LOA – Letter of Authorisation/Agreement/Authority
LOD – Lines of Defence
LOE – Lease Operating Expenses
LOGGN – Logging Whilst Drilling
LOGGS – Lincolnshire Offshore Gas Gathering System
LOGRS – Log Restoration Report
LOGSM – Log Sample
LOK – Low Permeability
LOKG – Low Permeability Gas
LOKO – Low Permeability Oil
LOLER – Lifting Operations and Lifting Equipment Regulations
LOPA – Layer of Protection Analysis IEC 61511
LOT – Leak-Off Test
LOT – Linear Override Tool
LOT – Lock Open Tool
LOTO – Lock Out / Tag Out
LP – Low Pressure
LPG – Liquefied Petroleum Gas
LPH – Litres Per Hour
LPWHH – Low Pressure Well Head Housing
LQ – Living Quarters
LRA – Lower Riser Assembly
LRG – Liquified Refinery Gas
LRP – Lower Riser Package
LSBGR – Long Spacing BHC GR Log
LSD – Land Surface Datum
LSP – Life Support Package
LSSON – Long Spacing Sonic Log
LT – Linear Time or Lag Time
L&T – Load and Test
LTC – Long Thread and Coupled
LT&C – Long Thread and Coupled
LTHCP – Lower Tubing Hanger Crown Plug
 – Lost Time Incident (Frequency Rate)
LTP – liner shaker, tensile bolting cloth, perforated panel backing
LTX – Low temperature extraction unit
LUMI – Luminescence Log
LUN – Livening Up Notice
LVEL – Linear Velocity Log
LVOT – Linear Valve Override Tool
LWD – Logging While Drilling
LWOL – Last Well on Lease
LWOP – Logging Well on Paper

M
M or m – prefix designating a number in thousands (not to be confused with SI prefix M for mega- or m for milli)
m – metre
MAASP – maximum acceptable [or allowable] annular surface pressure
MAC – multipole acoustic log
MACL – multiarm caliper log
MAE – major accident event
MAGST – magnetostratigraphic report
MAL - Master Acronym List
MAOP – maximum allowable operating pressure
MAP – metrol acoustic processor 
MARA – maralog
MAST – sonic tool (for recording waveform)
MAWP – maximum allowable working pressure
MBC – marine breakaway coupling
MBC – membrane brine concentrator
Mbd – thousand barrels per day
MBES – multibeam echosounder
Mbod – thousand barrels of oil per day
Mboe – thousand barrels of oil equivalent
Mboed – thousand barrels of oil equivalent per day
MBP – mixed-bed polisher
Mbpd – thousand barrels of oil per day
MBR – minimum bend radius
MBRO – multi-bore restriction orifices
MBT – methylene blue test
MBWH – multi-bowl wellhead
MCC – motor control centre
MCD – mechanical completion dossier
Mcf – thousand cubic feet of natural gas
Mcfe – thousand cubic feet of natural gas equivalent
MCHE – main cryogenic heat exchanger
MCM – manifold choke module
MCP – monocolumn platform
MCS – manifold and connection system
MCS – master control station
MCSS – multi-cycle sliding sleeve
mD – millidarcy, measure of permeability, with units of area
MD – measured depth
MDO – marine diesel oil
MDR – master document register
MDRT – measured depth referenced to rotary table zero datum
MD – measurements/drilling log
MDEA – methyl diethanolamine (aMDEA)
MDL – methane drainage licence (United Kingdom), a type of onshore licence allowing natural gas to be collected "in the course of operations for making and keeping safe mines whether or not disused"
MDSS – measured depth referenced to mean sea level zero datum – "sub sea" level
MDT – modular formation dynamic tester
MDR – mud damage removal (acid bullheading)
MEA – monoethanolamine
MEG – monoethylene glycol
MEIC – Mechanical Electrical Instrumentation Commission
MeOH – methanol (CH3OH)
MEPRL – mechanical properties log
MERCR – mercury injection study report
MERG – merge FDC/CNL/gamma ray/dual laterolog/micro SFL log
MEST – micro-electrical scanning tool 
MF – marsh funnel (mud viscosity)
MFCT – multifinger caliper tool
MGL – magnelog
MGPS – marine growth prevention system
MHWN – mean high water neaps
MHWS – mean high water springs
MLH – mud liner hanger
MIFR – mini frac log
MINL – minilog
MIPAL – micropalaeo log
MIRU – move in and rig up
MIST – minimum industry safety training
MIT – mechanical integrity test
MIYP – maximum internal yield pressure
mKB – meters below kelly bushing
ML – mud line (depth reference)
ML – microlog, or mud log
MLL – microlaterolog
MLF – marine loading facility
MLWN – mean low water neaps
MLWS – mean low water springs
mm – millimetre (SI unit)
MM – prefix designating a number in millions (thousand-thousand)
MMbod – million barrels of oil per day
MMboe – million barrels of oil equivalent
MMboed – million barrels of oil equivalent per day
MMbpd – million barrels per day
MMcf – million cubic feet (of natural gas)
MMcfe – million cubic feet (of natural gas equivalent)
MMcfge – million cubic feet (of natural gas equivalent)
MMS – Minerals Management Service (United States)
MMscfd – million standard cubic feet per day
MMTPA – millions of metric tonnes per annum
MMstb – million stock barrels
MNP – merge and playback log
MODU – mobile offshore drilling unit (either of jack-up drill rig or semi-submersible rig or drill ship)
MOF – marine offloading facility
MOPO – matrix of permitted operations
MOPU – mobile offshore production unit (to describe jack-up production rig, or semi-submersible production rig, or floating production, or storage ship)
MOT – materials/marine offloading terminal
MOV – motor operated valve
MPA – micropalaeo analysis report
MPD – managed pressure drilling
MPFM – multi-phase flow meter
MPK – merged playback log
MPP – multiphase pump
MPQT – manufacturing procedure qualification test
MPS – manufacturing procedure specification
MPSP – maximum predicted surface pressure
MPSV – multi-purpose support vessel
MPV – multi-purpose vessel
MQC – multi-quick connection plate
MR – marine riser
MR – mixed refrigerant
MR – morning report
MRBP – magna range bridge plug
MRC – maximum reservoir contact
MRCV – multi-reverse circulating valve
MRIT – magnetic resonance imaging tool
MRIRE – magnetic resonance image report
MRP – material requirement planning
MRR – material receipt report
MRT – marine riser tensioners
MRT – mechanical run test
MRX – magnetic resonance expert (wireline NMR tool) 
MSCT – mechanical sidewall coring tool 
MSDS – material safety data sheet
MSFL – micro SFL log; micro-spherically focussed log (resistivity)
MSI – mechanical and structural inspection
MSIP – modular sonic imaging platform (sonic scanner) 
MSIPC – multi-stage inflatable packer collar
MSL – mean sea level
MSL – micro spherical log
MSS – magnetic single shot
MST – MST EXP resistivity log
MSV – multipurpose support vessel
MTBF – mean time between failures
MT – motor temperature; DMT parameter for ESP motor
MTO – material take-off
MTT – MTT multi-isotope trace tool
M/U – make up
MUD – mud log
MUDT – mud temperature log
MuSol – mutual solvent
MVB – master valve block on christmas tree
MVC – minimum volume commitment
MW  – mud weight
MWD – measurement while drilling
MWDRE – measurement while drilling report
MWP – maximum working pressure
MWS – marine warranty survey

N
NACE – National Association of Corrosion Engineers
NAPE – Nigerian Association of Petroleum Explorationists
NAM – North American
NAPF – non-aqueous phase fluid
NAPL – non-aqueous phase liquid
NASA – non-active side arm (term used in North Sea oil for kill wing valve on a christmas tree)
NAVIG – navigational log
NB – nominal bore
NCC – normally clean condensate
ND – nipple down
NDE – non-destructive examination
NEFE – non-emulsifying iron inhibitor (usually used with hydrochloric acid)
NEUT – neutron log
NFG – 'no fucking good' used for marking damaged equipment,
NFI – no further investment
NFW – new field wildcat, Lahee classification
NG – natural gas
NGDC – national geoscience data dentre (United Kingdom)
NGL – natural gas liquids
NGR – natural gamma ray
NGRC – national geological records centre (United Kingdom)
NGS – NGS log
NGSS – NGS spectro log
NGT – natural gamma ray tool
NGTLD – NGT LDT QL log
NGLQT – NGT QL log
NGTR – NGT ratio log
NHDA – National Hydrocarbons Data Archive (United Kingdom)
NHPV – net hydrocarbon pore volume
NMDC – non-magnetic drill collar
NMHC – non-methane hydrocarbons
NMR – nuclear magnetic resonance kog
NMVOC – non-methane volatile organic compounds
NNF – normally no flow
NNS – northern North Sea
NOISL – noise log
NOC – National Oil Company
NORM – naturally-occurring radioactive material
NP – non-producing well
NPD – Norwegian Petroleum Directorate
NPS – nominal pipe size (sometimes NS)
NPSH(R) – net-positive suction head (required)
NPT – Non-Productive Time (used during drilling or well intervention operations mainly, malfunction of equipment or the lack of personnel competences that result in lost of time, which is costly)
NPV – net present value
NRB – not required back
NRPs – non-rotating protectors 
NRI – net revenue interest
NRV – non-return valve
NPW – new pool wildcat, Lahee classification
NS – North Sea; can also refer to the North Slope Borough, Alaska, the North Slope, which includes Prudhoe Bay Oil Field (the largest US oil field), Kuparuk Oil Field, Milne Point, Lisburne, and Point McIntyre among others
NTHF – non-toxic high flash
NTU – nephelometric turbidity unit
NUBOP – nipple (ed),(ing) up blow-out preventer
NUI – normally unattended installation
NUMAR – nuclear and magnetic resonance – image log

O
O&G – oil and gas
O&M – operations and maintenance
O/S – overshot, fishing tool
OBCS – ocean bottom cable system
OBDTL – OBDT log
OBEVA – OBDT evaluation report
OBM – oil-based mud
OBO – operated by others
OCIMF – Oil Companies International Marine Forum
OCI – oil corrosion inhibitor (vessels)
OCL – quality control log
OCM – offshore construction manager
OCS – offshore construction supervisor
OCTG – oil country tubular goods (oil well casing, tubing, and drill pipe)
OD – outer diameter (of a tubular component such as casing)
ODT – oil down to
OFE – oil field equipment
OFST – offset vertical seismic profile
OEM – original equipment manufacturer
OFIC – offshore interim completion certificate
OGA – Oil and Gas Authority (UK oil and gas regulatory authority)
OH – open hole
OH – open hole log
OHC – open hole completion
OHD – open hazardous drain
OHUT – offshore hook-up team
OI – oxygen index
OLAF – offshore footless loading arm
OIM – offshore installation manager
OMRL – oriented micro-resistivity log
ONAN – oil natural air natural cooled transformer
ONNR – Office of Natural Resources Revenue (formerly MMS)
OOE – offshore operation engineer (senior technical authority on an offshore oil platform)
OOIP – original oil in place
OOT/S – out of tolerance/straightness
OPITO – offshore petroleum industry training organization
OPEC – Organization of Petroleum Exporting Countries
OPL – operations log
OPRES – overpressure log
OPS – operations report
ORICO – oriented core data report
ORM – operability reliability maintainability
ORRI – overriding royalty interest
ORF – onshore receiving facility
OS&D – over, short, and damage report
OS – online survey
OSV – offshore supply vessel
OT – a well on test
OT – off tree
OTDR – optical time domain reflectometry
OTIP – operational testing implementation plan
OTL – operations team leader
OTP – operational test procedure
OTR – order to remit
OTSG – one-time through steam generator
OWC – oil-water contact
OUT – outpost, Lahee classification
OUT – oil up to
OVCH – oversize charts
OVID – offshore vessel inspection database

P
P – producing well
P&A – plug(ged) and abandon(ed) (well)
PA – producing asset
PA – polyamide
PA – producing asset with exploration potential
PACO – process, automation, control and optimisation
PACU – packaged air conditioning unit
PADPRT – pressure assisted drillpipe running tool
PAGA – public address general alarm
PAL – palaeo chart
PALYN – palynological analysis report
PAR – pre-assembled rack
PAU – pre-assembled ynit
PBDMS – playback DMSLS log
PBHL – proposed bottom hole location
PBR – polished bore receptacle (component of a completion string)
PBD – pason billing system
PBTD – plug back total depth
PBU – pressure build-up (applies to integrity testing on valves)
PCA – production concession agreement
PCB – polychlorinated biphenyl
PCCC – pressure containing anti‐corrosion caps
PCCL – perforation casing collar locator log
PCDC – pressure-cased directional (geometry i.e. borehole survey) MWD tool
PCE – pressure control equipment
PCDM – power and control distribution module
PCKR – packer
PCMS – polymer coupon monitoring system
PCN – process control network
PCO – pre-commission preparations (pipeline)
PCOLL – perforation and collar
PCP – progressing cavity pump
PCP – possible condensate production
PCPT – piezo-cone penetration test
PCS – process control system
PDC – perforation depth control
PDC – polycrystalline diamond compact (a type of drilling bit)
PDG/PDHG – permanent downhole gauge
PDGB – permanent drilling guide base
PDKL – PDK log
PDKR – PDK 100 report
PDM –positive displacement motor
PDMS – permanent fownhole monitoring system
PDP – proved developed producing (reserves)
PDP – positive displacement pump
PDPM – power distribution protection module
PDNP – proved developed not producing
PDR – physical data room
PDT – differential pressure transmitter
PE – petroleum engineer
PE – professional engineer
PE – production engineer
PE – polyethylene
PE – product emulsion
PE – production enhancement
PEA – palaeo environment study report
PED – pressure equipment directive
PEDL – petroleum exploration and development licence (United Kingdom)
PEFS – process engineering flow scheme
PENL – penetration log
PEP – PEP log
PERC – powered emergency release coupling
PERDC – perforation depth control
PERFO – perforation log
PERM – permeability
PERML – permeability log
PESGB – Petroleum Exploration Society of Great Britain
PETA – petrographical analysis report
PETD – petrographic data log
PETLG – petrophysical evaluation log
PETPM – petrography permeametry report
PETRP – petrophysical evaluation report
PEX – platform express toolstring (resistivity, porosity, imaging)
PFC – perforation formation correlation
PFD – process flow diagram
PFE – plate/frame heat exchanger
PFHE – plate fin/frame heat exchanger
PFPG – perforation plug log
PFREC – perforation record log
PG – pressure gauge (report)
PGC – Potential Gas Committee
PGB – permanent guide base
PGOR – produced gas oil ratio
PGP – possible gas production
PH – phasor log
PHASE – phasor processing log
PHB – pre-hydrated bentonite
PHC – passive heave compensator
PHOL – photon log
PHPU – platform hydraulic power unit
PHPA – partially hydrolyzed polyacrylamide
PHYFM – physical formation log
PI – productivity index
PI – permit issued
PI – pressure indicator
P&ID – piping and instrumentation diagram
PINTL – production interpretation
PIP – pump intake pressure
PIP – pipe in pipe
PIT – pump intake temperature
PJSM – per-job safety meeting
PL – production license
PLEM – pipeline end manifold
PLES – pipeline end structure
PLET – pipeline end termination
PLG – plug log
PLR – pig launcher/receiver
PLS – position location system
PLSV – pipelay support vessel
PLT – production logging tool
PLTQ – production logging tool quick-look log
PLTRE – production logging tool report
PLQ – permanent living quarters
PMI – positive material identification
PMOC – project management of change
PMR – precooled mixed refrigerant
PMV – production master valve
PNP – proved not producing
POB – personnel on board
POBM – pseudo-oil-based mud
POD – plan of development
POF – permanent operations facility
POH – pull out of hole
POOH – pull out of hole
PON – petroleum operations notice (United Kingdom)
POP – pump-out plug
POP – possible oil production
POP  –  place on production
POR – density porosity log
PORRT - pack off run retrieval tool
POSFR – post-fracture report
POSTW – post-well appraisal report
POSWE – post-well summary report
PP – DXC pressure plot log
PP  – pump pressure
PP&A – permanent plug and abandon (also P&A)
ppb – pounds per barrel
PPC – powered positioning caliper (Schlumberger dual-axis wireline caliper tool)
ppcf – pounds per cubic foot
PPD - pour point depressant
PPE – preferred pressure end
PPE – personal protective equipment
PPFG – pore pressure/fracture gradient
ppg – pounds per gallon
PPI – post production inspection/intervention
PPI – post pipelay installation
PPL – pre-perforated liner
 – pounds (per square inch) per thousand feet (of depth) – a unit of fluid density/pressure
PPS – production packer setting
PPU – pipeline process and umbilical
PQR – procedure qualification record
PR2 – testing regime to API6A annex F
PRA – production reporting and allocation
PREC – perforation record
PRESS – pressure report
PRL – polished rod liner
PRV – pressure relief valve
PROD – production log
PROTE – production test report
PROX – proximity log
PRSRE – pressure gauge report
PSANA – pressure analysis
PSA – production service agreement
PSA – production sharing agreement
PSC – production sharing contract
PSD – planned shut-down
PSD – pressure safety device
PSD – process shut-down
PSD – pump setting depth
PSE – pressure safety element (rupture disc)
PSIA – pounds per square inch atmospheric
PSIG – pounds per square inch gauge
PSL – product specification level
PSLOG – pressure log
PSM – process safety management
PSP – pseudostatic spontaneous potential
PSP – positive sealing plug
PSPL – PSP leak detection log
PSSR – pre-startup safety review
PSSR – pressure systems safety regulations (UK)
PSQ – plug squeeze log
PST – PST log
PSV – pipe/platform supply vessel
PSV – pressure safety valve
PSVAL – pressure evaluation log
PTA/S – pipeline termination assembly/structure
PTO – permit to sperate
PTRO – test rack opening pressure (For a gas lift valve)
PTSET – production test setter
PTTC – Petroleum Technology Transfer Council, United States
PTW – permit to work
PU – pick-up (tubing, rods, power swivel, etc.)
PUD – proved undeveloped reserves 
PUN – puncher log
PUR – plant upset report
PUQ – production utilities quarters (platform)
PUWER – Provision and Use of Work Equipment Regulations 1998
PV – plastic viscosity
PVDF – polyvinylidene fluoride
PVSV –pressure vacuum safety valve
PVT – pressure volume temperature
PVTRE – pressure volume temperature report
PW – produced water
PWD – pressure while drilling
PWB – production wing block (XT)
PWHT – post-weld heat treat
PWRI – produced water reinjection
PWV – production wing valve (also known as a flow wing valve on a christmas tree)

Q
QA – quality assurance
QC – quality control
QCR – quality control report
QL – quick-look log

R
R/B – rack back
R&M – repair and maintenance
RAC – ratio curves
RACI – responsible / accountable / consulted / informed
RAT – riser assembly tower
RAM – reliability, availability, and maintainability
RAWS – raw stacks VSP log
RBI – risk-based inspection
RBP – retrievable bridge plug
RBS – riser base spool
RCA – root cause analysis
RCKST – rig checkshot
RCD – rotating control device
RCI – reservoir characterization instrument (for downhole fluid measurements e.g. spectrometry, density)
RCL – retainer correlation log
RCM – reliability-centred maintenance
RCR – remote component replacement (tool)
RCU – remote control unit
RDMO – rig down move out
RDS – ROV-deployed sonar
RDRT – rig down rotary tools
RDT – reservoir description tool
RDVI – remote digital video inspection
RDWL – rig down wireline
RE – reservoir engineer
REOR – reorientation log
RE-PE – re-perforation report
RESAN – reservoir analysis
RESDV – riser emergency shut-down valve
RESEV – reservoir evaluation
RESFL – reservoir fluid
RESI – resistivity log
RESL – reservoir log
RESOI – residual oil
REZ – renewable energy zone (United Kingdom)
RF – recovery factor
RFCC – ready for commissioning certificate
RFLNG – ready for liquefied natural gas
RFM – riser feeding machine
RFMTS – repeat formation tester
RFO – ready for operations (pipelines/cables)
RFR – refer to attached (e.g., letter, document)
RFSU – ready for start-up
RFT – repeat formation tester
RFTRE – repeat formation tester report
RFTS – repeat formation tester sample
RHA – riser heel anchor
RHD – rectangular heavy duty – usually screens used for shaking
RIGMO – rig move
RIH – run in hole
RIMS – riser integrity monitoring system
RITT – riser insertion tube (tool)
RKB – rotary kelly bushing (a datum for measuring depth in an oil well)
RLOF – rock load-out facility
RMLC – request for mineral land clearance
RMP – reservoir management plan
RMS – ratcheting mule shoe
RMS – riser monitoring system
RNT – RNT log
ROB – received on board (used for fuel/water received in bunkering operations)
ROCT – rotary coring tool
ROP – rate of penetration
ROP – rate of perforation
ROT – remote-operated tool
ROV/WROV – remotely-operated vehicle/work class remotely-operated vehicle, used for subsea construction and maintenance
ROZ – recoverable oil zone
ROWS – remote operator workstation
RPCM – ring pair corrosion monitoring
RPM – revolutions per minute (rotations per minute)
RRC – Railroad Commission of Texas (governs oil and gas production in Texas)
RROCK – routine rock properties report
RRR – reserve replacement ratio
RSES – responsible for safety and environment on site
RSPP – a publicly-traded oil and gas producer focused on horizontal drilling of multiple stacked pay zones in the oil-rich Permian basin
RSS – rig site survey
RSS – rotary steerable systems
RST – reservoir saturation tool (Schlumberger) log
RTMS – riser tension monitoring system
RTE – rotary table elevation
RTO - real-time operation
RTP/RTS – return to production/service
RTTS – retrievable test-treat-squeeze (packer)
RU – rig up
RURT – rig up rotary tools
RV – relief valve
RVI – remote video inspection
RWD – reaming while drilling

S
SABA – supplied air-breathing apparatus
SAFE – safety analysis function evaluation
SAGD – steam-assisted gravity drainage
SALM – single anchor loading mooring
SAM – subsea accumulator module
SAML – sample log
SAMTK – sample-taker log
SANDA – sandstone analysis log
SAPP – sodium acid pyrophosphate
SAS – safety and automation system
SAT – SAT log
SAT – site acceptance test
SB – SIT-BO log
SBF – synthetic base fluid
SBM – synthetic base mud
SBT – segmented bond tool
SC – seismic calibration
SCADA – supervisory control and data acquisition
SCAL – special core analysis
SCAP – scallops log
SCBA – self-contained breathing apparatus
SCUBA – self-contained underwater breathing apparatus
SCC – system completion certificate
SCD – system control diagram
SCDES – sidewall core description
scf – standard cubic feet (of gas)
scf/STB – standard cubic feet (of gas) / stock tank barrel (of fluid)
SCHLL – Schlumberger log
 – subsea control module (mounting base)
SCO – synthetic crude oil
SCO – sand clean-out
SCR – slow circulation rate
SCRS – slow circulation rates
SCSG – type of pump
SCSSV – surface-controlled subsurface safety valve
SDON – shut down overnight
SPCU – subsea control unit
SCVF – surface casing vent flow. It's kind of test
SD – sonic density
SDFD – shut down for day
SDFN – shut down for night
SDIC – sonic dual induction
SDL – supplier document list
SDM/U – subsea distribution module/unit
SDPBH – SDP bottom hole pressure report
SDSS – super duplex stainless steel
SDT – step draw-down test (sometimes SDDT)
SDU/M – subsea distribution unit/module
SEA – strategic environmental assessment (United Kingdom)
SECGU – section gauge log
SEDHI – sedimentary history
SEDIM – sedimentology
SEDL – sedimentology log
SEDRE – sedimentology report
SEG – Society of Exploration Geophysicsists
SEM – subsea electronics module
Semi (or semi-sub) – semi-submersible drilling rig
SEPAR – separator sampling report
SEQSU – sequential survey
SFERAE – global association for the use of knowledge on fractured rock in a state of stress, in the field of energy, culture and environment
SFL – steel flying lead
SG – static gradient, specific gravity
SGR – shale gouge ratio
SGS – steel gravity structure
SGSI – Shell Global Solutions International
SGUN – squeeze gun
SHA – sensor harness assembly
SHC – system handover certificate
SHDT – stratigraphic high resolution dipmeter tool
SHINC – sunday holiday including
SHO – stab and hinge over
SHOCK – shock log
SHOWL – show log
SHT – shallow hole test
SI – shut in well
SI – structural integrity
SI – scale inhibitor
SI/TA – shut in/temporarily abandoned
SIA – social impact assessment
SIC – subsea installation contractor
SICP – shut-in casing pressure
SIDPP – shut-in drill pipe pressure
SIDSM – sidewall sample
SIF – safety instrumented functions (test)
SIGTTO – Society of International Gas Tanker and Terminal Operators
SIL – safety integrity level
SIMCON – simultaneous construction
SIMOPS – simultaneous operations
SIP – shut-in pressure
SIPCOM – simultaneous production and commissioning
SIPES – Society of Independent Professional Earth Scientists, United States
SIPROD – simultaneous production and drilling 
SIS – safety-instrumented system
SIT – system integration test FR SIT – field representation SIT
SIT – (casing) shoe integrity test
SITHP – shut-in tubing hanger/head pressure
SITT – single TT log
SIWHP – shut-in well head pressure
SKPLT – stick plot log
SL – seismic lines
SLS – SLS GR log
SLT – SLT GR log
SM or S/M – safety meeting
SMA – small amount
SMLS – seamless PipeMPP
SMO – suction module
SMPC – subsea multiphase pump, which can increase flowrate and pressure of the untreated wellstream
SN – seat nipple
SNAM – Societá Nazionale Metanodotti now Snam S.p.A. (Italy)
SNP – sidewall neutron porosity
SNS – southern North Sea
SOBM – synthetic oil-based mud
SOLAS – safety of life at sea
SONCB – sonic calibration log
SONRE – sonic calibration report
SONWR – sonic waveform report
SONWV – sonic waveform log
SOP – shear-out plug
SOR – senior operations representative
SOW – slip-on wellhead
SP – set point
SP – shot point (geophysics)
SP – spontaneous potential (well log)
SPAMM – subsea pressurization and monitoring manifold
SPCAN – special core analysis
SPCU – subsea power and control unit
SPE – Society of Petroleum Engineers
SPEAN – spectral analysis
SPEL – spectralog
spf – shots per foot (perforation density)
SPFM – single-phase flow meter
SPH – SPH log
SPHL – self-propelled hyperbaric lifeboats
SPM – side pocket mandrel 
SPM – strokes per minute (of a positive-displacement pump)
spm – shots per meter (perforation density)
SPMT – self-propelled modular transporter
SPOP – spontaneous potential log
SPP – stand pipe pressure
SPR – slow pumping rate
SPROF – seismic profile
SPS – subsea production systems
SPT – shallower pool test, Lahee classification
SPUD – spud date (started drilling well)
SPWLA – Society of Petrophysicists and Well Log Analysts
SQL – seismic quicklook log
SQZ – squeeze job
SR  – shear rate
SRD – seismic reference datum, an imaginary horizontal surface at which TWT is assumed to be zero
SREC – seismic record log
SRJ – semi-rigid jumper
SRK – Soave-Redlich-Kwong
SRO – surface read-out
SRP – sucker rod pump
SRB – sulfate-reducing bacteria
SRT – site receival test
SS – subsea, as in a datum of depth, e.g. TVDSS (true vertical depth subsea)
SSCC – sulphide stress corrosion cracking
SSCP – subsea cryogenic pipeline
SSCS – subsea control system
SSD – sub-sea level depth (in metres or feet, positive value in downwards direction with respect to the geoid)
SSD – sliding sleeve door
SSFP – subsea flowline and pipeline
SSG – sidewall sample gun
SSH – steam superheater
SSIC – safety system inhibit certificate
SSIV – subsea isolation valve
SSTV – subsea test valve
SSM – subsea manifolds
SSMAR – synthetic seismic marine log
SSPLR – subsea pig launcher/receiver
SSSL – Supplementary Seismic Survey Licence (United Kingdom), a type of onshore licence
SSSV – sub-surface safety valve
SSTT – subsea test tree
SSU – subsea umbilicals
SSV – surface safety valve
SSWI – subsea well intervention
STAB – stabiliser
STAGR – static gradient survey report
STB – stock tank barrel
STC – STC log
STD – 2-3 joints of tubing
STFL – steel tube fly lead
STG – steam turbine generator
STGL – stratigraphic log
STHE - shell-and-tube heat exchanger 
STIMU – stimulation report
STKPT – stuck point
STL – STL gamma ray log
STL – submerged turret loading
STRAT – stratigraphy, stratigraphic
STRRE – stratigraphy report
STOIIP – stock tank oil initially in place
STOP – safety training observation program
STP – submerged turret production
STSH – string shot
STTR – single top tension riser
ST&C – short thread and coupled
STC – short thread and coupled
STU – steel tube umbilical
STV – select tester valve
SUML – summarised log
SUMRE – summary report
SUMST – geological summary sheet
SURF – subsea/umbilicals/risers/flowlines
SURFR – surface sampling report
SURRE – survey report
SURU – start-up ramp-up
SURVL – survey chart log
 – subsea umbilical termination (assembly/box)
SUTU – subsea umbilical termination unit
SW – salt water
SWC – side wall core
SWD – salt water disposal well
SWE – senior well engineer
SWHE – spiral-wound heat exchanger
SWOT – strengths, weaknesses, opportunities, and threats
SWT – surface well testing
SV – sleeve valve, or standing valve
SVLN – safety valve landing nipple
SWLP – seawater lift pump
SYNRE – synthetic seismic report
SYSEI – synthetic seismogram log

T
T – well flowing to tank
T/T – tangent to tangent
TA – temporarily abandoned well
TA – top assembly
TAC – tubing anchor
TAGOGR – thermally assisted gas/oil gravity drainage
TAN – total acid number
TAPLI – tape listing
TAPVE – tape verification
TAR – true amplitude recovery
TB – tubing puncher log
TBE – technical bid evaluation
TBG – tubing
TBT – through bore tree / toolbox talk
TCA – total corrosion allowance
TCC – tungsten carbide coating
TCCC – transfer of care, custody and control
TCF – temporary construction facilities
TCF – trillion cubic feet (of gas)
TCI – tungsten carbide insert (a type of rollercone drillbit)
TCP – tubing conveyed perforating (gun)
TCPD – tubing-conveyed perforating depth
TCU – thermal combustion unit
TD – target depth
TD – total depth (depth of the end of the well; also a verb, to reach the final depth, used as an acronym in this case)
TDD – total depth (driller)
TDC – total drilling cost
TDL – total depth (logger)
TDM – touch-down monitoring
TDP – touch-down point
TDS – top drive system
TDS – total dissolved solids
TDT – thermal decay time log
TDTCP – TDT CPI log
TDT GR – TDT gamma ray casing collar locator log
TEA – triethanolamine
TEFC – totally enclosed fan-cooled
TEG – triethylene glycol
TEG  –  thermal electric generator
TELER – teledrift report
TEMP – temperature log
TETT – too early to tell 
TFE – total fina elf (obsolete; Now Total S.A.) major French multinational oil company
TFL – through flow line
TFM – TaskForceMajella research project
TFM – tubular feeding machine
TGB – temporary guide base
TGT / TG – tank gross test
TGOR – total gas oil ratio (GOR uncorrected for gas lift gas present in the production fluid)
TH – tubing hanger
THCP – tubing hanger crown plug
Thr/Th# – thruster ('#'- means identification letter/number of the equipment, e.g. thr3 or thr#3 means "thruster no. 3")
THD – tubing head
THERM – thermometer log
THF – tubing hanger flange
THF – tetrahydrofuran (organic solvent)
THP – tubing hanger pressure (pressure in the production tubing as measured at the tubing hanger)
THRT – tubing hanger running tool
THS – tubing head spool
TIE – tie-in log
TIH – trip into hole
TIT – tubing integrity test
TIW – Texas Iron Works (pressure valve)
TIEBK – tieback report
TLI – top of logging interval
TLOG – technical log
TLP – tension-leg platform
TMCM – transverse mercator central meridian
TMD – total measured depth in a wellbore
TNDT – thermal neutron decay time
TNDTG – thermal neutron decay time/gamma ray log
TOC – top of cement
TOC – Total organic carbon
TOF – top of fish
TOFD – time of first data sample (on seismic trace)
TOFS – time of first surface sample (on seismic trace)
TOH – trip out of hole
TOOH – trip out of hole
TOL – top of liner
TORAN – torque and drag analysis
TOVALOP – tanker owners' voluntary agreement concerning liability for oil pollution
TPC – temporary plant configuration
TPERF – tool performance
TQM – total quality management
TR – temporary refuge
TRCFR – total recordable case frequency rate
TRT – tree running tool
TR – temporary refuge
TRA – top riser assembly
TRA – tracer log
TRACL – tractor log
TRAN –transition zone
TRD – total report data
TREAT – treatment report
TREP – test report
TRIP – trip condition log
TRS – tubing running services
TRSV – tubing-retrievable safety valve
TRSCSSV – tubing-Retrievable surface-controlled sub-surface valve
TRSCSSSV – tubing-retrievable surface-controlled sub-surface safety valve
TSA – thermally-sprayed aluminium
TSA – terminal storage agreement
TSI – temporarily shut in
TSOV – tight shut-off valve
TSS – total suspended solids
TSTR  – tensile strength
TT – torque tool
TT – transit time log
TTOC – theoretical top of cement
TTVBP – through-tubing vented bridge plug
TTRD – through-tubing rotary drilling
TUC – topside umbilical connection
TUC – turret utility container
TUM – tracked umbilical machine
TUPA – topside umbilical panel assembly
TUTB – topside umbilical termination box/unit/assembly (TUTU)
TVBDF – true vertical depth below derrick floor
TV/BIP – ratio of total volume (ore and overburden) to bitumen in place
TVD – true vertical depth
TVDPB – true vertical depth playback log
TVDRT – true vertical depth (referenced to) rotary table zero datum
TVDKB – true vertical depth (referenced to) top kelly bushing zero datum
TVDSS – true vertical depth (referenced to) mean sea level zero datum
TVELD – time and velocity to depth
TVRF – true vertical depth versus repeat formation tester
TWT – two-way time (seismic)
TWTTL – two-way travel time log

U
UBHO – universal bottom hole orientation (sub)
UBI – ultrasonic borehole imager
UBIRE – ultrasonic borehole imager report
UCH – umbilical connection housing
UCIT – ultrasonic casing imaging tool (high resolution casing and corrosion imaging tool)
UCL – unit control logic
UCR – unsafe condition report
UCS – unfonfined compressive strength
UCSU – upstream commissioning and start-up
UFJ – upper flex joint
UFR – umbilical flow lines and risers
UGF – universal guide frame
UIC – underground injection control
UKCS – United Kingdom continental shelf
UKOOA – United Kingdom Offshore Operators Association
UKOOG – United Kingdom Onshore Operators Group
ULCGR – uncompressed LDC CNL gamma ray log
UMCA – umbilical midline connection assembly
UMV – upper master valve (from a christmas tree)
UPB – unmanned production buoy
UPL – upper pressure limit
UPR – upper pipe ram
UPT – upper pressure threshold
URA – upper riser assembly
URT – universal running tool
USBL – ultra-short baseline systems
USIT – ultrasonic imaging tool (cement bond logging, casing wear logging)
USGS – United States Geological Survey
UTA/B – umbilical termination assembly/box
UTAJ – umbilical termination assembly jumper
UTHCP – upper tubing hanger crown plug
UTM – universal transverse mercator
UWI – unique well identifier
UWILD – underwater inspection in lieu of dry-docking
UZV – shutdown valve

V
VBR – variable bore ram
VCCS – vertical clamp connection system
VDENL – variation density log
VDL – variable density log
VDU – vacuum distillation unit, used in processing bitumen
VELL – velocity log
VERAN – verticality analysis
VERIF – verification list
VERLI – verification listing
VERTK – vertical thickness
VFC – volt-free contact
VGMS – vent gas monitoring system (flexible riser annulus vent system)
VIR – value-investment ratio
VISME – viscosity measurement
VIV – vortex-induced vibration
VLP – vertical lift performance
VLS – vertical lay system
VLTCS – very-low-temperature carbon steel
VO – variation order
VOCs – volatile organic compounds
VOR – variation order request
VRS – vapor recovery system
VRR – voidage replacement ratio
VS  – vertical section
VSD – variable-speed drive
VSI – versatile seismic imager (Schlumberger VSP tool)
VSP – vertical seismic profile
VSPRO – vertical seismic profile
VTDLL – vertical thickness dual laterolog
VTFDC – vertical thickness FDC CNL log
VTISF – vertical thickness ISF log
VWL – velocity well log
VXT – vertical christmas tree

W
W – watt
WABAN – well abandonment report
WAC – weak acid cation
WAG – water alternating gas (describes an injection well which alternates between water and gas injection)
WALKS – walkaway seismic profile
WAS – well access system
WATAN – water analysis
WAV3 – amplitude (in seismics)
WAV4 – two-way travel time (in seismics)
WAV5 – compensate amplitudes
WAVF – waveform log
WBCO – wellbore clean-out
WBE – well barrier element
WBM – water-based drilling mud
WBS – well bore schematic
WBS – work breakdown structure
WC – watercut
WC – sildcat (well)
W/C – water cushion
WCC – work control certificate
WCT – wet christmas tree
WE – well engineer
WEG – wireline entry guide
WELDA – well data report
WELP – well log plot
WEQL – well equipment layout
WESTR – well status record
WESUR – well summary report
WF – water flood(ing)
WFAC – waveform acoustic log
WGEO – well geophone report
WGFM – wet gas flow meter
WGR – water gas ratio
WGUNT – water gun test
Wh – white
WH – well history
WHIG – whitehouse gauge
WHM – wellhead maintenance
WHP – wellhead pressure
WHRU – waste heat recovery unit
WHSIP – wellhead shut-in pressure
WI – water injection
WI – working interest
WI – work instructions
WIKA – definition needed
WIMS – well integrity management system
WIR – water intake risers
WIT – water investigation tool
WITS – Wellsite Information Transfer Specification
WITSML – wellsite information transfer standard markup language
WIPSP – WIP stock packer
WLC – wireline composite log
WLL – wireline logging
WLSUM – well summary
WLTS –well log tracking system
WLTS – well log transaction system
WM – wet mate
WHM – wellhead maintenance
WHMIS – workplace hazardous material information systems
WHP – wellhead pressure
WO – well in work over
WO/O – waiting on orders
WOA – well operations authorization
WOB – weight on bit
WOC – wait on cement
WOC – water/oil contact (or oil/water contact)
WOE – well operations engineer (a key person of well services)
WOM – wait/waiting on material
WOR – water-oil ratio
WORKO – workover
WOS – west of Shetland, oil province on the UKCS
WOW – wait/waiting on weather
WP – well proposal or working pressure
WPC – water pollution control
WPLAN – well course plan
WPQ/S/T – weld procedure qualification/specification/test
WPP – wellhead protection platform
WPR – well prognosis report
WQ – a textural parameter used for CBVWE computations (Halliburton)
WQCA – Water Quality Control Act
WQCB – Water Quality Control Board
WR – wireline retrievable (as in a WR plug)
WR – wet resistivity
WRS – well report sepia
WRSCSSV – wireline-retrievable surface-controlled sub-surface valve
WSCL – well site core log
WSE – well seismic edit
WSERE – well seismic edit report
WSG – wellsite geologist
WSHT – well shoot
WSL – well site log
WSO – water shut-off
WSOG – well-specific operation guidelines
WSP – well seismic profile
WSR – well shoot report
WSS – well services supervisor (leader of well services at the wellsite)
WSS – working spreadsheet (for logging)
WSSAM – well site sample
WSSOF – WSS offset profile
WSSUR – well seismic survey plot
WSSVP – WSS VSP raw shots
WSSVS – WSS VSP stacks
WST – well seismic tool (checkshot)
WSTL – well site test log
WSU – well service unit
wt – wall thickness
WT – well test
WTI – West Texas Intermediate benchmark crude
WTR – water
WUT – water up to
WV – wing valve (from a christmas tree)
WVS – well velocity survey
WWS – wire-wrapped (sand) screens

X
XC – cross-connection, cross correlation
XL or EXL - exploration licence (United Kingdom), a type of onshore licence issued between the First Onshore Licensing Round (1986) and the sixth (1992)
Xln – crystalline (minerals)
XLPE -cross-linked polyethylene
XMAC – cross-multipole array acoustic log
XMAC-E – XMAC elite (next generation of XMAC)
XMRI – extended-range micro-imager (Halliburton)
XMT/XT/HXT – christmas tree
XO – cross-over
XOM – Exxon Mobil
XOV – cross-over valve 
XPERM – matrix permeability in the x-direction
XPHLOC – crossplot selection for XPHI
XPOR – crossplot porosity
XPT – formation pressure test log (Schlumberger)
XV – on/off valve (process control)
XYC – XY caliper log (Halliburton)

Y
yd – yard
yl – holdup factor
YP – yield point
yr – year

Z
Z – depth, in the geosciences referring to the depth dimension in any x, y, z data
ZDENP – density log
ZDL – compensated Z-densilog
ZLD – zero liquid discharge
ZOI – zone of influence

See also
Oilfield terminology

References

External links 
 Network International Glossary  July-11
 Oil Field Acronyms and Abbreviations July-11
 Oil Gas Technical Terms Glossary July-11
 Schlumberger Oilfield Glossary July-11
 Oil Drum Acronyms July-11
 Oiltrashgear Oilfield Acronyms & Terminology November-15
 OCIMF Acronyms Oct-11
 SPWLA Petrophysical Curve Names and Mnemonics Oct-11
 American Royalty Council Glossary Nov-11
 Technip Glossary  Apr-13

Petroleum industry
Abbreviations
Abbreviations
Drilling technology
Energy-related lists
Lists of acronyms
Oil exploration